Taimi Mattsson (25 June 1913 – 5 May 1993) was a Finnish fencer. She competed in the women's individual foil event at the 1952 Summer Olympics.

References

1913 births
1993 deaths
Finnish female foil fencers
Olympic fencers of Finland
Fencers at the 1952 Summer Olympics
Sportspeople from Helsinki